Gerónimo Emiliano Berroa (born March 18, 1965) is a Dominican former professional baseball outfielder. He played for nine Major League Baseball (MLB) teams from 1989 to 2000, and also played one season in the KBO League in 2002.

Signed by the Toronto Blue Jays as an amateur free agent in 1983, he worked his way through the minor leagues. After the 1988 season, he was picked up by the Atlanta Braves in the rule 5 draft. He made his major league debut on April 5, 1989. He spent 1989 and a small amount of 1990 with the Braves, and spend most of 1990 and 1991 with the Richmond Braves and Colorado Springs Sky Sox, respectively. He returned to the majors in 1992 with the Cincinnati Reds, and the following year was an inaugural member of the 1993 Florida Marlins expansion team.

After the season, he signed as a free agent with the Oakland Athletics, and had his best years with that team. Berroa's best season was 1996 when he hit 36 home runs with 106 RBIs for the Athletics. He spent the next three seasons with the Baltimore Orioles, Cleveland Indians, Detroit Tigers, Blue Jays, and Los Angeles Dodgers.

In 11 major league seasons, he hit 101 home runs, had 692 hits, and 510 strikeouts. He played for the Korea Baseball Organization's Lotte Giants in 2002 and the Sultanes de Monterrey of the Mexican League in 2003 before retiring.

Berroa played with the Dominican club Leones del Escogido, winning the 1988, 1990 and 1991 Caribbean Series, winning the MVP award in 1990 and 1991, and being inducted into the Caribbean Baseball Hall of Fame in 2016.

On December 20, 2007, Berroa was accused by former major league pitcher Jason Grimsley of using anabolic steroids in a federal agent's affidavit.

References

External links

Career statistics and player information from the KBO League

1965 births
Living people
Atlanta Braves players
Baltimore Orioles players
Cincinnati Reds players
Cleveland Indians players
Colorado Springs Sky Sox players
Detroit Tigers players
Dominican Republic expatriate baseball players in Canada
Dominican Republic expatriate baseball players in Mexico
Dominican Republic expatriate baseball players in South Korea
Dominican Republic expatriate baseball players in the United States
Dunedin Blue Jays players
Edmonton Trappers players
Florence Blue Jays players
Florida Marlins players
Gulf Coast Blue Jays players
KBO League infielders
Kinston Blue Jays players
Knoxville Blue Jays players
Leones del Escogido players
Los Angeles Dodgers players
Lotte Giants players
Major League Baseball designated hitters
Major League Baseball players from the Dominican Republic
Major League Baseball right fielders
Medicine Hat Blue Jays players
Mexican League baseball left fielders
Mexican League baseball right fielders
Nashville Sounds players
Oakland Athletics players
Ottawa Lynx players
Sportspeople from Santo Domingo
Piratas de Campeche players
Richmond Braves players
Sultanes de Monterrey players
Syracuse Chiefs players
Syracuse SkyChiefs players
Toronto Blue Jays players
Tigres del Licey players
Ventura County Gulls players